Calliaghstown Well, also called St. Columbkille's Well, is a holy well and National Monument located in County Meath, Ireland.

Location

History and description

The well was a traditional site of pilgrimage for locals, and a pattern took place there each year on 9 June. A statue, erected perhaps in the mid-18th century, is called St Colm Cille, although with a mantle and crown it does not resemble traditional depictions of Columba/Colm Cille, who is usually depicted in a monk's habit (although he was of a royal family).

References

National Monuments in County Meath
Archaeological sites in County Meath